El Perú: Itinerarios de Viajes is an expansive written work covering a variety of topics in the natural history of Peru, written by the prominent Italian-born Peruvian geographer and scientist Antonio Raimondi in the latter half of the 19th century.  The work was compiled from extensive and detailed notes Raimondi took while criss-crossing the country, studying the nation's geography, geology, meteorology, botany, zoology, ethnography, and archaeology; El Perú focuses to some extent on each of these topics and others.  The first volume was published in 1874; several more volumes were published both before Raimondi's death and posthumously from his notes, the last being released in 1913, making a five volume set.  The volumes are a classic example of exploration scholarship, and form one of the earliest and broadest scientific reviews of Peru's natural and cultural heritage.

References
Raimondi, Antonio.  El Perú : itinerarios de viajes (literal transcription from published 1929 copy). Published online by the Biblioteca Virtual Miguel de Cervantes from a 1929 edition.  Spanish language.
Wiard, Brenda.  "2neat books: For Sale: Peruvian Publications". Retrieved September 23, 2005.

External links
El Perú : itinerarios de viajes (versión literal de libretas originales) Original text, tables, and drawings of El Perú, published online by the Biblioteca Virtual Miguel de Cervantes.  Spanish language.

Environment of Peru
Peruvian non-fiction books
1874 non-fiction books
1913 non-fiction books
Archaeology books
Science books
Travel books
Books about Peru